"Wanderlust" is a song by American rock band R.E.M. It was released as their fourth and final single from their 13th studio album, Around the Sun (2004), peaking at number 27 in the United Kingdom (becoming their last of 31 top-40 hits there) and number 48 in Ireland. The song has a partially compound time signature;  during the verses and  during the chorus.

A version of the song called "Wanderlust (Clayton St. Studio version)" was released as a digital download only and later added in the compilation AthFest 10.

Track listings
All tracks were written by Peter Buck, Mike Mills, and Michael Stipe unless otherwise stated.

7-inch (W676)
"Wanderlust"
"The Outsiders" (feat. Q-Tip)

CD 1 (W676CD1)
"Wanderlust"
"Low" (Alternate Version) (Berry, Buck, Mills, Stipe)

CD 2 (W676CD2)
"Wanderlust"
"The Outsiders" (Alternate Version)
"Bad Day" (Live Video, Zaragoza, 28.05.05)1
1 Recorded at Recinto Ferial de la Feria de Muestras in Zaragoza, Spain; May 28, 2005.

Digital download
"Wanderlust"
"Wanderlust" (Live, Santa Barbara, CA, 14.10.04)

Charts

References

R.E.M. songs
2004 songs
2005 singles
Song recordings produced by Michael Stipe
Song recordings produced by Mike Mills
Song recordings produced by Pat McCarthy (record producer)
Song recordings produced by Peter Buck
Songs written by Michael Stipe
Songs written by Mike Mills
Songs written by Peter Buck
Warner Records singles